Crazy Racer, also known in some countries as Silver Medalist, is a 2009 Chinese black comedy film directed and written by Ning Hao and stars Huang Bo. It was filmed mostly in the southern coastal city of Xiamen.

Plot 
The plot follows four seemingly separate stories that intersect and converge at points throughout the movie. It begins with the protagonist Geng Hao losing first place in a cycling race and subsequently being tricked into sponsoring an energy drink containing illegal performance-enhancing substances by corrupt businessman Li Fala, which causes him to forfeit the winnings from his silver medal. Disgraced and outlawed from ever participating again in the sport, Geng's coach suffers from a heart attack, prompting Geng to seek retribution from Li, who he believes is the cause. In the process of obtaining the money for his coach's funeral, Geng crosses the paths of local criminals, perpetually confused policemen and even Taiwanese gangsters.

Cast
Huang Bo
Jiu Kong
Rong Xiang

Reception
The film garnered mostly positive reviews from the Chinese press although it has remained relatively unknown outside of mainland china.

Perry Lam of Muse praises Ning Hao's direction: 'the movie leaps from scene to scene with such an athletic deftness and comic inevitability that the many unlikely curves and switches in the plot and the same setups feel almost like the machinery of fate.'

References

External links
 
 

2009 films
2000s Mandarin-language films
2009 black comedy films
Chinese black comedy films
Films set in Fujian
Films directed by Ning Hao
2009 comedy films
Hokkien-language films